Călimănești, often known as Călimănești-Căciulata, is a town in Vâlcea County, southern Romania. It is situated in the historical region of Oltenia and the northern part of the county, on the traditional route connecting the region to Transylvania, and at the southern end of the Olt River valley crossing the Southern Carpathians.

The location of several thermal springs, Călimănești-Căciulata is known as a spa town. During the 20th century, many hotels and treatment facilities were built in Căciulata, a northern area of the town which is close to Cozia Monastery. The Monastery was built by Mircea the Old in 1388 which is also the day of the city Călimănești and Râmnicu Vâlcea (just south on DN7).

Arutela Roman Fort is located here.

The area around the town is full of fresh water springs and spa waters that are not in use. The old town was a bit smaller, the island you see on river Olt was bigger and the road was on what is now the river bed. In 1918 it was the major point of invasion in Transylvania. The town is built along DN7. The second most used road in Romania, used by Romanians to travel up to Transylvania and recently often used to go to Hungary, Austria and many other EU nations.

The town administers five villages: Căciulata, Jiblea Nouă, Jiblea Veche, Seaca and Păușa.

Gallery

Notable people 
 Ion Duminicel (born 1954), bobsledder
 Nicolae Rădescu (1874–1953), lieutenant general and last pre-communist rule Prime Minister of Romania
 Florin Zamfirescu (born 1949), theater and film actor and director

References

External links

 Călimănești-Căciulata Site 

Towns in Romania
Spa towns in Romania
Populated places in Vâlcea County
Localities in Oltenia